The 1979 Cal State Northridge  Matadors football team represented California State University, Northridge as a member of the California Collegiate Athletic Association (CCAA) during the 1979 NCAA Division II football season. Led by first-year head coach Tom Keele, Cal State Northridge compiled an overall record of 3–7 with a mark of 1–1 in conference play, placing second in the CCAA. The team was outscored by its opponents 239 to 144 for the season. The Matadors played home games at North Campus Stadium in Northridge, California.

Schedule

References

Cal State Northridge
Cal State Northridge Matadors football seasons
Cal State Northridge Matadors football